Achaea phaeobasis is a species of moth of the family Erebidae first described by George Hampson in 1913. It is found in the Democratic Republic of the Congo, South Sudan, Tanzania and Uganda.

References

Achaea (moth)
Insects of Uganda
Erebid moths of Africa
Moths described in 1913